T. Alp Ikizler is a nephrologist, currently holding the Catherine McLaughlin Hakim chair in Medicine at Vanderbilt University School of Medicine, where he does clinical work and heads a research lab. Born in Istanbul, Turkey, he received his M.D. from the Istanbul University Faculty of Medicine.

Dr. Ikizler's research focuses on the nutritional and metabolic aspects of kidney disease. Specifically, his work involves identifying reliable and practical tests for protein-caloric malnutrition, which is associated with heightened risks of mortality in kidney failure patients, and using these tests to assess different treatment strategies. One study established that dialysis changes protein metabolism in such a way as to stimulate protein degradation in muscle and other tissues. Work by Ikizler's team showed that dialysis-stimulated proteolysis is partly induced by inflammation; and that parenteral nutrition during dialysis, as well as exercise during dialysis, can mitigate the defects in protein metabolism. Later, papers assessed the effectiveness of oral nutritional supplementation, alone or with resistance exercise.

Selected publications

Caglar, K, Yilmaz, MI, Saglam, M, Cakir, E, Kilic, S, Sonmez, A, Eyileten, T, Yenicesu, M, Oguz, Y, Tasar, M, Vural, A, Ikizler, TA, Stenvinkel, P, Lindholm, B. Serum Fetuin-A Concentration and Endothelial Dysfunction in Chronic Kidney Disease. Nephron Clin Pract, 2008
Fouque, D, Kalantar-Zadeh, K, Kopple, J, Cano, N, Chauveau, P, Cuppari, L, Franch, H, Guarnieri, G, Ikizler, TA, Kaysen, G, Lindholm, B, Massy, Z, Mitch, W, Pineda, E, Stenvinkel, P, Trevinho-Becerra, A, Wanner, C. A proposed nomenclature and diagnostic criteria for protein-energy wasting in acute and chronic kidney disease. Kidney Int, 73(4), 391-8, 2008
Ikizler, TA. Parenteral nutrition offers no benefit over oral supplementation in malnourished hemodialysis patients. Nat Clin Pract Nephrol, 4(2), 76-7, 2008
Ikizler, TA. Resolved: Being Fat Is Good for Dialysis Patients: The Godzilla Effect. J Am Soc Nephrol, 2008
Ikizler, TA. Nutrition, inflammation and chronic kidney disease. Curr Opin Nephrol Hypertens, 17(2), 162-7, 2008
Ramos, LF, Shintani, A, Ikizler, TA, Himmelfarb, J. Oxidative stress and inflammation are associated with adiposity in moderate to severe CKD. J Am Soc Nephrol, 19(3), 593-9, 2008
Himmelfarb, J, Ikizler, TA. Acute kidney injury: changing lexicography, definitions, and epidemiology. Kidney Int, 2007
Himmelfarb, J, Phinney, S, Ikizler, TA, Kane, J, McMonagle, E, Miller, G. Gamma-tocopherol and docosahexaenoic acid decrease inflammation in dialysis patients. J Ren Nutr, 17(5), 296-304, 2007
Ikizler, TA. Protein and energy intake in advanced chronic kidney disease: how much is too much. Semin Dial, 20(1), 5-11, 2007
Ikizler, TA. Effects of glucose homeostasis on protein metabolism in patients with advanced chronic kidney disease. J Ren Nutr, 17(1), 13-6, 2007
Lacson, E, Ikizler, TA, Lazarus, JM, Teng, M, Hakim, RM. Potential impact of nutritional intervention on end-stage renal disease hospitalization, death, and treatment costs. J Ren Nutr, 17(6), 363-71, 2007
Lacson, E, Lazarus, JM, Himmelfarb, J, Ikizler, TA, Hakim, RM. Balancing Fistula First with Catheters Last. Am J Kidney Dis, 50(3), 379-95, 2007
Majchrzak, KM, Pupim, LB, Flakoll, PJ, Ikizler, TA. Resistance Exercise Augments the Acute Anabolic Effects of Intradialytic Oral Nutritional Supplementation. Nephrol Dial Transplant, 2007
Majchrzak, KM, Pupim, LB, Sundell, M, Ikizler, TA. Body composition and physical activity in end-stage renal disease. J Ren Nutr, 17(3), 196-204, 2007
Pupim, LB, Flakoll, PJ, Ikizler, TA. Exercise improves albumin fractional synthetic rate in chronic hemodialysis patients. Eur J Clin Nutr, 61(5), 686-9, 2007
Siew, ED, Pupim, LB, Majchrzak, KM, Shintani, A, Flakoll, PJ, Ikizler, TA. Insulin resistance is associated with skeletal muscle protein breakdown in non-diabetic chronic hemodialysis patients. Kidney Int, 71(2), 146-52, 2007
Trirogoff, ML, Shintani, A, Himmelfarb, J, Ikizler, TA. Body mass index and fat mass are the primary correlates of insulin resistance in nondiabetic stage 3-4 chronic kidney disease patients. Am J Clin Nutr, 86(6), 1642-8, 2007
Wingard, RL, Pupim, LB, Krishnan, M, Shintani, A, Ikizler, TA, Hakim, RM. Early intervention improves mortality and hospitalization rates in incident hemodialysis patients: RightStart program. Clin J Am Soc Nephrol, 2(6), 1170-5, 2007
Chertow, GM, Soroko, SH, Paganini, EP, Cho, KC, Himmelfarb, J, Ikizler, TA, Mehta, RL. Mortality after acute renal failure: models for prognostic stratification and risk adjustment. Kidney Int, 70(6), 1120-6, 2006
Cho, KC, Himmelfarb, J, Paganini, E, Ikizler, TA, Soroko, SH, Mehta, RL, Chertow, GM. Survival by dialysis modality in critically ill patients with acute kidney injury. J Am Soc Nephrol, 17(11), 3132-8, 2006
Ikizler, TA, Himmelfarb, J. Muscle wasting in kidney disease: Let's get physical. J Am Soc Nephrol, 17(8), 2097-8, 2006
Ikizler, TA, Himmelfarb, J. Trials and trade-offs in haemodialysis vascular access monitoring. Nephrol Dial Transplant, 21(12), 3362-3, 2006
Liu, KD, Himmelfarb, J, Paganini, E, Ikizler, TA, Soroko, SH, Mehta, RL, Chertow, GM. Timing of initiation of dialysis in critically ill patients with acute kidney injury. Clin J Am Soc Nephrol, 1(5), 915-9, 2006
Pupim, LB, Cuppari, L, Ikizler, TA. Nutrition and metabolism in kidney disease. Semin Nephrol, 26(2), 134-57, 2006
Pupim, LB, Majchrzak, KM, Flakoll, PJ, Ikizler, TA. Intradialytic oral nutrition improves protein homeostasis in chronic hemodialysis patients with deranged nutritional status. J Am Soc Nephrol, 17(11), 3149-57, 2006
Yilmaz, MI, Korkmaz, A, Kaya, A, Sonmez, A, Caglar, K, Topal, T, Eyileten, T, Yenicesu, M, Acikel, C, Oter, S, Yaman, H, Aktug, H, Oguz, Y, Vural, A, Ikizler, TA. Hyperbaric oxygen treatment augments the efficacy of a losartan regime in an experimental nephrotic syndrome model. Nephron Exp Nephrol, 104(1), e15-22, 2006
Basi, S, Pupim, LB, Simmons, EM, Sezer, MT, Shyr, Y, Freedman, S, Chertow, GM, Mehta, RL, Paganini, E, Himmelfarb, J, Ikizler, TA. Insulin resistance in critically ill patients with acute renal failure. Am J Physiol Renal Physiol, 289(2), F259-64, 2005
Ikizler, TA. Effects of hemodialysis on protein metabolism. J Ren Nutr, 15(1), 39-43, 2005
Ikizler, TA. Protein and energy: recommended intake and nutrient supplementation in chronic dialysis patients. Semin Dial, 17(6), 471-8, 2005
Ikizler, TA, Schulman, G. Hemodialysis: techniques and prescription. Am J Kidney Dis, 46(5), 976-81, 2005
Lim, VS, Ikizler, TA, Raj, DS, Flanigan, MJ. Does hemodialysis increase protein breakdown? Dissociation between whole-body amino acid turnover and regional muscle kinetics. J Am Soc Nephrol, 16(4), 862-8, 2005
Majchrzak, KM, Pupim, LB, Chen, K, Martin, CJ, Gaffney, S, Greene, JH, Ikizler, TA. Physical activity patterns in chronic hemodialysis patients: comparison of dialysis and nondialysis days. J Ren Nutr, 15(2), 217-24, 2005
Pupim, LB, Flakoll, PJ, Majchrzak, KM, Aftab Guy, DL, Stenvinkel, P, Ikizler, TA. Increased muscle protein breakdown in chronic hemodialysis patients with type 2 diabetes mellitus. Kidney Int, 68(4), 1857–65, 2005
Pupim, LB, Flakoll, PJ, Yu, C, Ikizler, TA. Recombinant human growth hormone improves muscle amino acid uptake and whole-body protein metabolism in chronic hemodialysis patients. Am J Clin Nutr, 82(6), 1235–43, 2005
Pupim, LB, Heimbürger, O, Qureshi, AR, Ikizler, TA, Stenvinkel, P. Accelerated lean body mass loss in incident chronic dialysis patients with diabetes mellitus. Kidney Int, 68(5), 2368–74, 2005
Simmons, EM, Langone, A, Sezer, MT, Vella, JP, Recupero, P, Morrow, JD, Ikizler, TA, Himmelfarb, J. Effect of renal transplantation on biomarkers of inflammation and oxidative stress in end-stage renal disease patients. Transplantation, 79(8), 914-9, 2005
Yenicesu, M, Yilmaz, MI, Caglar, K, Sonmez, A, Eyileten, T, Kir, T, Acikel, C, Bingol, N, Oguz, Y, Ikizler, TA, Vural, A. Adiponectin level is reduced and inversely correlated with the degree of proteinuria in type 2 diabetic patients. Clin Nephrol, 64(1), 12-9, 2005
Eustace, Joseph A, Astor, Brad, Muntner, Paul M, Ikizler, T Alp, Coresh, Josef. Prevalence of acidosis and inflammation and their association with low serum albumin in chronic kidney disease. Kidney Int, 65(3), 1031–40, 2004
Flakoll, Paul J, Kent, Pamela, Neyra, Roxanna, Levenhagen, Deanna, Chen, Kong Y, Ikizler, T Alp. Bioelectrical impedance vs air displacement plethysmography and dual-energy X-ray absorptiometry to determine body composition in patients with end-stage renal disease. JPEN J Parenter Enteral Nutr, 28(1), 13-21, 2004
Himmelfarb, J, Le, P, Klenzak, J, Freedman, S, McMenamin, ME, Ikizler, TA, . Impaired monocyte cytokine production in critically ill patients with acute renal failure. Kidney Int, 66(6), 2354–60, 2004
Himmelfarb, J, McMonagle, E, Freedman, S, Klenzak, J, McMenamin, E, Le, P, Pupim, LB, Ikizler, TA, The PICARD Group, . Oxidative stress is increased in critically ill patients with acute renal failure. J Am Soc Nephrol, 15(9), 2449–56, 2004
Ikizler, T Alp, Sezer, M Tugrul, Flakoll, Paul J, Hariachar, Sree, Kanagasundaram, N Suren, Gritter, Nancy, Knights, Stephanie, Shyr, Yu, Paganini, Emil, Hakim, Raymond M, Himmelfarb, Jonathan, . Urea space and total body water measurements by stable isotopes in patients with acute renal failure. Kidney Int, 65(2), 725-32, 2004
Ikizler, TA. Role of nutrition for cardiovascular risk reduction in chronic kidney disease patients. Adv Chronic Kidney Dis, 11(2), 162-71, 2004
Mehta, RL, Pascual, MT, Soroko, S, Savage, BR, Himmelfarb, J, Ikizler, TA, Paganini, EP, Chertow, GM, . Spectrum of acute renal failure in the intensive care unit: the PICARD experience. Kidney Int, 66(4), 1613–21, 2004
Oberg, B Payson, McMenamin, Elizabeth, Lucas, F Lee, McMonagle, Ellen, Morrow, Jason, Ikizler, T Alp, Himmelfarb, Jonathan. Increased prevalence of oxidant stress and inflammation in patients with moderate to severe chronic kidney disease. Kidney Int, 65(3), 1009–16, 2004
Pupim, LB, Caglar, K, Hakim, RM, Shyr, Y, Ikizler, TA. Uremic malnutrition is a predictor of death independent of inflammatory status. Kidney Int, 66(5), 2054–60, 2004
Pupim, LB, Flakoll, PJ, Ikizler, TA. Protein homeostasis in chronic hemodialysis patients. Curr Opin Clin Nutr Metab Care, 7(1), 89-95, 2004
Pupim, LB, Flakoll, PJ, Ikizler, TA. Nutritional supplementation acutely increases albumin fractional synthetic rate in chronic hemodialysis patients. J Am Soc Nephrol, 15(7), 1920-6, 2004
Pupim, LB, Himmelfarb, J, McMonagle, E, Shyr, Y, Ikizler, TA. Influence of initiation of maintenance hemodialysis on biomarkers of inflammation and oxidative stress. Kidney Int, 65(6), 2371-9, 2004
Pupim, Lara B, Flakoll, Paul J, Levenhagen, Deanna K, Ikizler, T Alp. Exercise augments the acute anabolic effects of intradialytic parenteral nutrition in chronic hemodialysis patients. Am J Physiol Endocrinol Metab, 286(4), E589-97, 2004
Pupim, Lara B, Ikizler, T Alp. Assessment and monitoring of uremic malnutrition. J Ren Nutr, 14(1), 6-19, 2004
Simmons, EM, Himmelfarb, J, Sezer, MT, Chertow, GM, Mehta, RL, Paganini, EP, Soroko, S, Freedman, S, Becker, K, Spratt, D, Shyr, Y, Ikizler, TA, . Plasma cytokine levels predict mortality in patients with acute renal failure. Kidney Int, 65(4), 1357–65, 2004
Chertow, Glenn M, Pascual, Maria T, Soroko, Sharon, Savage, Brandon R, Himmelfarb, Jonathan, Ikizler, T Alp, Paganini, Emil P, Mehta, Ravindra L, . Reasons for non-enrollment in a cohort study of ARF: the Program to Improve Care in Acute Renal Disease (PICARD) experience and implications for a clinical trials network. Am J Kidney Dis, 42(3), 507-12, 2003
Danielski, Michael, Ikizler, T Alp, McMonagle, Ellen, Kane, Jane Conner, Pupim, Lara, Morrow, Jason, Himmelfarb, Jonathan. Linkage of hypoalbuminemia, inflammation, and oxidative stress in patients receiving maintenance hemodialysis therapy. Am J Kidney Dis, 42(2), 286-94, 2003
Kalantar-Zadeh, Kamyar, Ikizler, T Alp, Block, Gladys, Avram, Morrel M, Kopple, Joel D. Malnutrition-inflammation complex syndrome in dialysis patients: causes and consequences. Am J Kidney Dis, 42(5), 864-81, 2003
Neyra, R, Chen, KY, Sun, M, Shyr, Y, Hakim, RM, Ikizler, TA. Increased resting energy expenditure in patients with end-stage renal disease. JPEN J Parenter Enteral Nutr, 27(1), 36-42, 2003
Pupim, LB, Ikizler, TA. Uremic malnutrition: new insights into an old problem. Semin Dial, 16(3), 224-32, 2003
Pupim, Lara B, Evanson, James A, Hakim, Raymond M, Ikizler, T Alp. The extent of uremic malnutrition at the time of initiation of maintenance hemodialysis is associated with subsequent hospitalization. J Ren Nutr, 13(4), 259-66, 2003
Yildiz, Alaattin, Oflaz, Huseyin, Pusuroglu, Hamdi, Mercanoglu, Fehmi, Genchallac, Hakan, Akkaya, Vakur, Ikizler, T Alp, Sever, Mehmet S. Left ventricular hypertrophy and endothelial dysfunction in chronic hemodialysis patients. Am J Kidney Dis, 41(3), 616-23, 2003
Caglar, K, Fedje, L, Dimmitt, R, Hakim, RM, Shyr, Y, Ikizler, TA. Therapeutic effects of oral nutritional supplementation during hemodialysis. Kidney Int, 62(3), 1054-9, 2002
Caglar, K, Hakim, RM, Ikizler, TA. Approaches to the reversal of malnutrition, inflammation, and atherosclerosis in end-stage renal disease. Nutr Rev, 60(11), 378-87, 2002
Caglar, K, Peng, Y, Pupim, LB, Flakoll, PJ, Levenhagen, D, Hakim, RM, Ikizler, TA. Inflammatory signals associated with hemodialysis. Kidney Int, 62(4), 1408–16, 2002
Himmelfarb, J, Evanson, J, Hakim, RM, Freedman, S, Shyr, Y, Ikizler, TA. Urea volume of distribution exceeds total body water in patients with acute renal failure. Kidney Int, 61(1), 317-23, 2002
Himmelfarb, J, Stenvinkel, P, Ikizler, TA, Hakim, RM. The elephant in uremia: oxidant stress as a unifying concept of cardiovascular disease in uremia. Kidney Int, 62(5), 1524–38, 2002
Ikizler, TA. Epidemiology of vascular disease in renal failure. Blood Purif, 20(1), 6-10, 2002
Ikizler, TA, Morrow, JD, Roberts, LJ, Evanson, JA, Becker, B, Hakim, RM, Shyr, Y, Himmelfarb, J. Plasma F2-isoprostane levels are elevated in chronic hemodialysis patients. Clin Nephrol, 58(3), 190-7, 2002
Ikizler, TA, Pupim, LB, Brouillette, JR, Levenhagen, DK, Farmer, K, Hakim, RM, Flakoll, PJ. Hemodialysis stimulates muscle and whole body protein loss and alters substrate oxidation. Am J Physiol Endocrinol Metab, 282(1), E107-16, 2002
Pupim, LB, Flakoll, PJ, Brouillette, JR, Levenhagen, DK, Hakim, RM, Ikizler, TA. Intradialytic parenteral nutrition improves protein and energy homeostasis in chronic hemodialysis patients. J Clin Invest, 110(4), 483-92, 2002
Pupim, LB, Kent, P, Caglar, K, Shyr, Y, Hakim, RM, Ikizler, TA. Improvement in nutritional parameters after initiation of chronic hemodialysis. Am J Kidney Dis, 40(1), 143-51, 2002

References

External links
Ikizler Lab 

American nephrologists
Turkish emigrants to the United States
Vanderbilt University faculty
Living people
American academics of Turkish descent
Year of birth missing (living people)